Second Baptist Church of Wayne, also known as the Wayne Village Baptist Church, is a historic Baptist church located at Wayne in Schuyler County, New York.  It was built in 1846, and is a Greek Revival style frame church.  It has a temple front and two single story additions dating from 1876 / 1921 and 1972.  It features a projecting vestibule and a two-stage, domed bell tower contains the original bell cast in 1846.

It was listed on the National Register of Historic Places in 2014.

References

Baptist churches in New York (state)
19th-century Baptist churches in the United States
Churches on the National Register of Historic Places in New York (state)
Greek Revival church buildings in New York (state)
Churches completed in 1846
Churches in Schuyler County, New York
National Register of Historic Places in Schuyler County, New York